Brap: Back & Forth Series 3 & 4 is a compilation album by industrial band Skinny Puppy.  It was released as a double-CD in 1996. This album reached to #9 in Billboard chart's Top Heatseekers. Disc one is largely instrumental demos (only two tracks feature vocals and a few others vocal samples) whereas Disc two is composed mainly of live cuts (with only two or three studio tracks).  The cover art was created by Dave McKean. The CD also features enhanced CD content including a 3D style VR interface based on the Too Dark Park album and a virtual walk through the art of the Spasmolytic single.

Track listing 

European pressings include "Left Handshake", the omitted track from Last Rights, in between TFWO and Choralone, excluding the data tracks on both discs.

References

External links 

1996 compilation albums
Albums with cover art by Dave McKean
Skinny Puppy compilation albums
Nettwerk Records compilation albums